Julius Heinrich Petermann (born August 12, 1801 in Glauchau; died June 10, 1876 in Bad Nauheim) was a German Orientalist.

Biography 
In 1829, Petermann received his PhD in Berlin for a dissertation on the Targum Jonathan of the Pentateuch. Between 1830 and 1837, he was first a lecturer, then from 1837 an associate professor of Oriental philology at the University of Berlin. Between 1852 and 1855, Johann Gottfried Wetzstein, the German consul in Damascus, and the Prussian king sponsored his travel to Syria, Mesopotamia and Persia. From 1868 to 1869, he was consul in Jerusalem. He learned Armenian from the Mekhitarist Father Eduard on the island of San Lazzaro, which is part of Venice. In his Grammatica Linguae Armeniacae he offers proof that Armenian is an Indo-European language. In 1851, he wrote about the Armenian culture and music and in 1866 about their history. Petermann was interested in religious minorities such as the Samaritans, Druze, Mandaean, Yazidis, Parsees and Ahl-i Haqq. Information on these groups is found in his two-volume travelogue Journeys in the Orient. His research on the Samaritans and the Mandaeans was pioneering. He learned the Samaritan pronunciation from a Samaritan priest of Hebrew tradition in Nablus. He began his writings on these ethnic groups with a critical edition of the Samaritan Pentateuch, which comprised the first two volumes. Volumes 3 to 5 were released by Karl Vollers. Petermann published the first edition and Latin translation of two Mandaean writings, the Ginza and Sidra Rabba respectively, ("The Treasure", "The Great Directory") in his Thesaurus sive liber magnus.  He obtained a total of two collections of oriental manuscripts from 1532 for the Royal Library in Berlin. In 1840, he founded a series of concise textbooks, Porta linguarum Orientalium, on oriental languages, each with an anthology. In this series he published books on Arabic, Syriac, Armenian, Hebrew and Samaritan. Petermann was a member of the Berlin Masonic Lodge, Friedrich Wilhelm zur gekrönten Gerechtigkeit.

Works 
  Grammatica linguae armenicae  (1837 ) Berlin 
  De Ostikanis, Arabicis Armeniae gubernatoribus , Berlin 1840
 Contributions to a history of the latest reforms of the Ottoman Empire, German and Turkish (with Ramiz Efendi), Berlin 1842 
  Epistola ad Philemonem speciminis loco ad fidem versionum Orientalium veterum , Berlin 1844 
  Pater Ignatii Patris Apostolici quae feruntur Epistolae , Leipzig 1849
 Pistis Sophia: opus gnosticum (1851)
 Contributions to the history of the Crusades from Armenian sources, Berlin 1860 
 Journeys in the Orient, 1st edition. 2 vols. Leipzig, 1860 and 1861  
 Journeys in the Orient, 2nd edition. Leipzig, 1865 
 Thesaurus sive liber magnus liber vulgo Adami appellatus, 2 parts, Leipzig, 1867 (Syriac and Latin) 
 Attempt at a Hebraic morphology based on the Speech of Present-day Samaritans 1868 
 Pentateuchus Samaritanus, 5 vols. Berlin, 1872–91.
 Porta linguarum Orientalium (Editor) Vol. 1–4, 6, Berlin 
 Brevis linguae hebraicae 1864 
 Brevis linguae arabicae 1867 
 Brevis linguae armenicae 1872 
 Brevis linguae chaldaicae 1872

References

External links 
 Works by Julius Heinrich Petermann at the German National Library (German)

German Freemasons
German orientalists
1801 births
1876 deaths
German male non-fiction writers
Armenian studies scholars
Scholars of Mandaeism
Translators from Mandaic